Thomas Faith House is a historic home located at Washington, Daviess County, Indiana.  It was built in 1821, and is a -story, log, I-house.  It has a -story, timber frame rear addition dating to the 19th century and attached two-car garage.  It features a one-story front porch with an arched frieze and elaborate scrollwork.

It was added to the National Register of Historic Places in 1994.

References

Log houses in the United States
Washington, Indiana
Houses on the National Register of Historic Places in Indiana
Houses completed in 1821
Houses in Daviess County, Indiana
National Register of Historic Places in Daviess County, Indiana
Log buildings and structures on the National Register of Historic Places in Indiana